Herndon Terrace, also known as W.E. Thomson House, is a historic home located at Union, Union County, South Carolina.  It was built about 1845–1848, and is a two-story, Greek Revival style frame dwelling.  It features massive columned porticos on three sides, with solid brick columns covered with stucco. Also on the property are a once separate kitchen, that now adjoins the house, and an old slave cabin and cistern.

It was added to the National Register of Historic Places in 1970.

References

Houses on the National Register of Historic Places in South Carolina
Greek Revival houses in South Carolina
Houses completed in 1848
Houses in Union County, South Carolina
National Register of Historic Places in Union County, South Carolina
Slave cabins and quarters in the United States